The Art of Skiing is a Goofy cartoon made by Walt Disney Productions in 1941. It has historical significance as the first cartoon to use the now-famous Goofy holler, as well as the short that led to the "How to..." series, beginning with How to Play Baseball (1942) and continuing through How to Hook Up Your Home Theater (2007).

Notes
Goofy goes to Sugar Bowl Ski Resort, to learn how to ski.  The name of the resort can be seen in the opening frames of the cartoon.  Sugar Bowl Ski Resort was used because Walt Disney had an interest in the Sugar Bowl ski area, to the extent that one of the peaks at Sugar Bowl is named Mt. Disney after him.

The narrator and the opening titles mention an alternate (and obscure) pronunciation of skiing as shee-ing, despite the narrator mostly pronouncing it vice versa throughout the short. Another Goofy cartoon featured Goofy himself mentioning this to an Ancient Greek.

This was the first cartoon to use the signature Goofy holler; it is the only vocal uttered by Goofy in the short.

Voice cast
 Narrator: John McLeish
 Yodeler: Hannes Schroll

Releases
1941 – theatrical release
1956 – Disneyland, episode #2.24: "The Goofy Sports Story" (TV)
1972 – The Mouse Factory, episode #17: "Sports" (TV)
1976 – "Superstar Goofy" (TV)
c. 1983 – Good Morning, Mickey!, episode #80 (TV)
1983 – "A Disney Channel Christmas" (TV)
c. 1992 – Mickey's Mouse Tracks, episode #36 (TV)
c. 1997 – The Ink and Paint Club, episode #3: "Sports Goofy" (TV)
2010 – Have a Laugh!, episode #6 (TV)
2010 – Mickey's Christmas Special (TV)

Home media
The short was released on December 2, 2002, on Walt Disney Treasures: The Complete Goofy.

Additional releases include:
1981 – "Goofy Over Sports" (VHS)
1983 – "Cartoon Classics: More Sport Goofy" (VHS)
1986 – "Jiminy Cricket's Christmas" (VHS)
1992 – "Cartoon Classics Special Edition: The Goofy World of Sports" (VHS)
2001 – Bonus on DVD release of Santa Who? (DVD)
2001 – Goofy's Fun House (PlayStation Video Game)
2005 – "Classic Cartoon Favorites: Starring Goofy" (DVD)
2010 – Have a Laugh! Volume Two" (DVD)
2013 – Mickey's Christmas Carol: 30th Anniversary Edition (Blu-ray/DVD/Digital HD)
2018 – Olaf's Frozen Adventure (Blu-ray/DVD/Digital HD)

References 

 Borowiec, Piotr (1998) Animated Short Films: A Critical Index to Theatrical Cartoons Scarecrow Press  pg 21
 McCall, Douglas L. (1998) Film cartoons: a guide to 20th century American animated features and shorts McFarland & Co  pg 91
 Barrier, J. Michael (2007) The Animated Man: A Life of Walt Disney University of California Press  pg 349
 Lund, Morten (December 2009) "The Short, Sweet Ski Life of Hannes Schroll in America" Skiing Heritage Journal Vol 21 #4:13

External links
 
 

1941 short films
1941 animated films
1940s sports films
1940s Disney animated short films
Goofy (Disney) short films
American skiing films
Films directed by Jack Kinney
Films produced by Walt Disney
1940s English-language films
American animated short films
RKO Pictures short films
RKO Pictures animated short films
Animated films about dogs